The 2012–13 season was Feyenoord's 105th season of play. It was their 57th season in the Eredivisie and its 91st consecutive season in the highest Dutch football division. The club ended its league campaign in third place, being undefeated at home, and reached the quarter-finals of the KNVB Cup. Their European campaign ended after four matches, two each in the UEFA Champions League and UEFA Europa League. It was the club's second season under manager Ronald Koeman.

Competitions

Overall

Eredivisie

League table

Results summary

Matches

KNVB Cup

Champions League

Third qualifying round

Europa League

Third qualifying round

Player details

References

Feyenoord seasons
Feyenoord
Feyenoord
Feyenoord